Khvosh Rudbar (also Romanized as Khvosh Rūdbār; also known as Khoshk Rūdbār) is a village in Farim Rural District, Dodangeh District, Sari County, Mazandaran Province, Iran. At the 2006 census, its population was 31, in 10 families.

References 

Populated places in Sari County